Malisa Zini (March 5, 1921 – February 26, 1985) was an Argentine actress. She starred in the 1950 film Arroz con leche, among others such as Cumbres de hidalguía, under director Carlos Schlieper. s

Selected filmography
 The Boys Didn't Wear Hair Gel Before (1937)
 Honeysuckle (1938)
 Our Natacha (1944)
 The Prodigal Woman (1945)
 Lauracha (1946)

References

External links
 
 

Argentine film actresses
1921 births
1985 deaths
20th-century Argentine actresses